Paul William Westhead (born February 21, 1939) is an American retired basketball coach. He was the head coach for three National Basketball Association (NBA) teams and an assistant for four others, and also coached in the National Collegiate Athletic Association (NCAA), Women's National Basketball Association (WNBA), American Basketball Association (ABA), and Japan Basketball League (JBL). In his first year as an NBA head coach, he led a rookie Magic Johnson and the Los Angeles Lakers to the 1980 NBA Finals, which they won in six games for the team's first title in eight years. Westhead won titles in both the NBA and WNBA, and he is also remembered as the coach of the Loyola Marymount University (LMU) men's basketball team. Westhead is known for an unorthodox, run-and-gun style called "The System.” He was nicknamed "The Professor" due to his former career as an English teacher prior to coaching and his tendency to quote Shakespeare and other literary sources while coaching. He attended Saint Joseph's University.

1970s

Cheltenham High School
Westhead started his coaching career at Cheltenham High School in suburban Philadelphia; in 1968, he coached the Panthers to a loss in the Pennsylvania state championship. One of his players at Cheltenham was future University of Virginia Athletic Director Craig Littlepage.

La Salle University
Westhead coached the La Salle University men's basketball team starting in 1970 while also teaching as a professor in the English Department.  Westhead led the Explorers to one NIT and two NCAA tournament appearances in nine seasons (1970–1979).  He finished with a record of 142–105.

1980s

Los Angeles Lakers
Westhead started his NBA head coaching career by succeeding Jack McKinney as coach of the Los Angeles Lakers after serving briefly as his assistant (Westhead initially became interim head coach after McKinney was hospitalized due to a serious bicycle accident).  With rookie guard Magic Johnson and longtime star Kareem Abdul-Jabbar, the Lakers won the 1980 NBA Finals in Westhead's first year as coach, defeating Philadelphia in six games for the first title in their Showtime era. However, the team lost in the playoffs the next year to the Moses Malone-led Houston Rockets. Tensions grew between Westhead and Magic Johnson, as Johnson wanted Westhead to implement a fast break offense involving all five players that he felt better suited his style of play, while Westhead was insistent to continue running an isolation style offense centered on Kareem Abdul-Jabbar.  Westhead was fired early in his third season with the Lakers, and replaced with Pat Riley (whom Westhead had hired as an assistant). It is commonly believed that Magic Johnson orchestrated Westhead's ouster. A 1987 book called Winnin' Times (about the Los Angeles Lakers' franchise history) indicated that the Lakers' owner, Jerry Buss, wanted to fire Westhead several days prior to the actual occurrence, which is not mutually exclusive of the notion that Johnson had orchestrated it. In 1982, Buss said, "The irony, which makes what Magic did unfortunate, is that I had already decided to fire him. But I don't think anyone will ever totally believe that." Westhead finished his Lakers stint with a 111–50 record.

Chicago Bulls
Westhead was the head coach of the Chicago Bulls for the 1982–83 season, but lasted only one season as the Bulls went 28–54. Prior to that season, the Bulls traded away all-star center Artis Gilmore to the San Antonio Spurs, and the franchise was still two years away from the debut of Michael Jordan.

Loyola Marymount
Westhead returned to the college ranks, and took over as the head coach of the Loyola Marymount Lions men's basketball program.  From 1985 to 1990, Westhead oversaw an impressive run in which Loyola Marymount, despite being a smaller school and not a traditional NCAA basketball power, became a legitimate contender in NCAA hoops.  Westhead lured star players like Hank Gathers and Bo Kimble, who both transferred from USC, and rewrote many NCAA record books with Loyola Marymount's famous, up-tempo, run-and-gun style.

From 1988 to 1990, Westhead's teams went 27–3, 20–10 and 23–5 respectively, earning NCAA tournament berths each year.  Gathers led the NCAA in scoring and rebounding (32.7 ppg, 13.7 rpg) in 1989 and Kimble led the NCAA in scoring in 1990 (35.3 ppg). After the on-court death of Gathers in its conference tournament, LMU went on an inspired run in the NCAA tournament in 1990 that captured the attention of the entire college basketball world for those weeks. The Lions blew out defending champion Michigan in the 2nd round and made it to the Regional Final round before losing to eventual national champion, the UNLV Runnin' Rebels by 30 points.

Westhead's teams led Division I in scoring in 1988 (110.3 points per game), 1989 (112.5), and 1990 (122.4). LMU's 122.4 point per game in 1990 still remains the NCAA record as of 2023. As of April 2012, Loyola Marymount held the five highest combined score games in Division I history. Four of the five occurred during Westhead's career, including a record 331 in the 181–150 win over United States International University on January 31, 1989.

1990s

Denver Nuggets
After the 1989–1990 season, Westhead left LMU for the NBA's Denver Nuggets, a position he held for two seasons. His tenure in Denver was best known for attempting to incorporate the run-and-gun offense that worked for LMU to the NBA.

However, while Denver averaged a league-best 119.9 points per game in 1990–91, it also surrendered an NBA record 130.8 points per game. Their opponents never scored fewer than 100 points in any game, 
and only four opponents failed to score at least 110 points. They gave up 107 points in a single half to the Phoenix Suns, which remains an NBA record.  Under Westhead, the Nuggets were sometimes called the "Enver Nuggets" (as in no "D," or no defense). The next year the Nuggets drafted Dikembe Mutombo, who made the All-Star team, and played at a more conservative pace scoring just 99.7 points per game. However, they only improved to 24 wins, largely because they continued to give up points so quickly that even their prolific offense couldn't keep up.  Westhead was fired after posting a combined two-year record of 44–120.

George Mason
Following his tenure with the Nuggets, Westhead returned to college coaching as the head coach of George Mason University from 1993 to 1997.  This time, Westhead's run-and-gun style did not succeed at the college level, ending his tenure at Mason with a 38–70 record.  Westhead was succeeded at Mason by Jim Larranaga after the 1996–1997 season.

Golden State Warriors
From 1997 to 1999, Westhead was an assistant coach with the Golden State Warriors under head coach P. J. Carlesimo.

2000s

Los Angeles Stars
Westhead was the head coach of the Los Angeles Stars in the inaugural season of the new ABA in 2000–2001.

Panasonic Super Kangaroos
Westhead was the head coach of the Panasonic Super Kangaroos of the Japan Basketball League from 2001 to 2003.

Long Beach Jam
Westhead returned to the ABA as the head coach of Long Beach Jam in 2003. He coached the team for only one game before returning to the NBA.

Orlando Magic
From 2003 to 2005, Westhead was an assistant coach with the Orlando Magic under head coach Johnny Davis.

Phoenix Mercury
In 2005, Westhead was hired as the head coach of the WNBA's Phoenix Mercury, a position that he held until the 2007 WNBA season concluded. In 2007, Westhead coached the Mercury to a WNBA championship, making him the only coach to win a championship in the NBA and the WNBA. The Mercury won using Westhead's fast-paced approach.

Seattle SuperSonics/Oklahoma City Thunder
On September 27, 2007 he agreed to a contract with the NBA's Seattle SuperSonics to be an assistant coach under longtime friend P. J. Carlesimo. When Carlesimo was relieved of his duties on November 21, 2008, Westhead was also released as an assistant at that time.

2010s

University of Oregon, women's basketball
On March 26, 2009 University of Oregon Athletic Director Pat Kilkenny introduced Paul Westhead as the Ducks' newest head coach. As the sixth head coach in the history of Oregon women's basketball, this was Westhead's first job as head coach of an NCAA women's program (although he had coached women's teams at the professional level before).

On March 4, 2014, the University of Oregon announced that they would not renew Westhead's contract, which expired March 31, 2014. Westhead was 65–90 overall at Oregon and 27–64 in conference play in five seasons. Westhead's Oregon contract was worth more than $3 million for five years, with his final season earning him $675,000.

Head coaching record

Men's college basketball

NBA

|- ! style="background:#FDE910;"
| align="left" |Los Angeles
| align="left" |
|68||50||18||||align="center" |1st in Pacific||16||12||4||.750
| align="center" |Won NBA Championship
|-
| align="left" |Los Angeles
| align="left" |
|82||54||28||||align="center" |2nd in Pacific||3||1||2||.333
| align="center" |Lost in first round
|-
| align="left" |Los Angeles
| align="left" |
|11||7||4||||align="center" |(fired)||–||–||–||–
| align="center" |–
|-
| align="left" |Chicago
| align="left" |
|82||28||54||||align="center" |4th in Central||–||–||–||–
| align="center" |Missed Playoffs
|-
| align="left" |Denver
| align="left" |
|82||20||62||||align="center" |7th in Midwest||–||–||–||–
| align="center" |Missed Playoffs
|-
| align="left" |Denver
| align="left" |
|82||24||58||||align="center" |4th in Midwest||–||–||–||–
| align="center" |Missed Playoffs
|-
|-class="sortbottom"
| align="left" |Career||||407||183||224||||||19||13||6||.684||

WNBA

|-
| align="left" |PHX
| align="left" |2006
|34||18||16||.529|| align="center" |5th in West||–||–||–||–
| align="center" |Missed Playoffs
|-! style="background:#FDE910;"
| align="left" |PHX
| align="left" |2007
|34||23||11||.676|| align="center" |1st in West||9||7||2||.778
| align="center" |Won WNBA Finals
|-class="sortbottom"
| align="left" |Career
| ||68||41||27||.603|| ||9||7||3||.778||

Women's college basketball

Notes

References

External links
 Oregon profile
 NBA profile
 BasketballReference.com: Paul Westhead

1939 births
Living people
American expatriate basketball people in Japan
American men's basketball coaches
American men's basketball players
American women's basketball coaches
Basketball coaches from Pennsylvania
Basketball players from Philadelphia
Chicago Bulls head coaches
College men's basketball head coaches in the United States
Denver Nuggets head coaches
George Mason Patriots men's basketball coaches
Golden State Warriors assistant coaches
High school basketball coaches in the United States
La Salle Explorers men's basketball coaches
Los Angeles Lakers assistant coaches
Los Angeles Lakers head coaches
Loyola Marymount Lions men's basketball coaches
National Basketball Association championship-winning head coaches
Oklahoma City Thunder assistant coaches
Oregon Ducks women's basketball coaches
Orlando Magic assistant coaches
People from Cheltenham, Pennsylvania
Phoenix Mercury coaches
Saint Joseph's Hawks men's basketball players
Seattle SuperSonics assistant coaches
Sportspeople from Montgomery County, Pennsylvania
Women's National Basketball Association championship-winning head coaches